The "Esfahani" or "Isfahani style" (شیوه معماری اصفهانی) is a style of architecture defined by Mohammad Karim Pirnia  when categorizing Iranian architecture development in history. Landmarks of this style span through the Safavid, Afsharid, Zand, and Qajar dynasties starting from the 16th century to the early 20th century. 

The Isfahani style is the last style of traditional Persian–Iranian architecture.

The Safavid dynasty were chiefly instrumental in the emergence of this architectural style, which soon spread to India in what became known as Mughal architecture.

Examples
Examples of the Isfahani style include:
Chehelsotoon
Ali Qapu
Agha Bozorg Mosque, Kashan
Shah Mosque
Sheikh Lotf Allah Mosque.

See also
Isfahan
Iranian architecture
List of the historical structures in the Isfahan province
School of Isfahan

Gallery

References

External links
Encyclopedia Iranica on ancient Iranian architecture
Stucco decorations in Iranian architecture

Architecture in Iran
Safavid architecture